Aleksandr Viktorovich Kozhevnikov (born September 21, 1958) is a retired ice hockey player who played in the Soviet Hockey League. He played for Krylya Sovetov Moscow and HC Spartak Moscow.

Double-ply Olympic champion (1984 and 1988). He was inducted into the Russian and Soviet Hockey Hall of Fame in 1982.

He was born in Penza. Has daughter, Maria.

Career statistics

Regular season and playoffs

International

External links
 Russian and Soviet Hockey Hall of Fame bio

1958 births
Living people
HC Spartak Moscow players
Durham Wasps players
Medalists at the 1984 Winter Olympics
Olympic medalists in ice hockey
Sportspeople from Penza
Soviet expatriate ice hockey players
Ice hockey players at the 1984 Winter Olympics
Ice hockey players at the 1988 Winter Olympics
Olympic gold medalists for the Soviet Union
Olympic ice hockey players of the Soviet Union
Russian ice hockey players
Calgary Flames draft picks
Honoured Masters of Sport of the USSR